The Best: Sittin' In Again is the 10th release by singer-songwriter duo Loggins and Messina, a compilation album released in mid-2005. This release was timed to preview the duo's subsequent reunion tour. It contains most of their hits and provides a retrospective view of their music from 1971 to 1974. The 18 tracks appearing on the collection were personally selected by Loggins and Messina. Six of the tracks are from their debut album Sittin' In, six are from their 2nd release Loggins and Messina, four are off the 3rd album Full Sail, and two are featured on their 4th LP Mother Lode. No tracks from either of their last two studio albums (So Fine, Native Sons) are included. 

This compilation CD received some mixed reviews, however, because its emphasis was on songs performed on the duo's reunion tour, rather than a familiar "greatest hits" album. As such, some classic hits that were not performed, like "Thinking Of You" and "My Music", are also excluded from the CD.

Track listing
"Watching the River Run" (Kenny Loggins, Jim Messina) – 3:28
"Travelin' Blues" (Messina) – 3:43
"Your Mama Don't Dance" (Loggins, Messina) – 2:49
"Be Free" (Messina) – 6:59
"Till The Ends Meet" (Loggins) – 3:09
"Nobody But You" (Messina) – 3:00
"House at Pooh Corner" (Loggins) – 4:24
"A Love Song" (Loggins, Dona Lyn George) – 3:12
"Danny's Song" (Loggins) – 4:16
"Long Tail Cat" (Loggins) – 3:49
"Just Before the News" (Messina) – 1:11
"Listen to a Country Song" (Messina, Al Garth) – 2:49
"Good Friend" (Messina) – 4:05
"Same Old Wine" (Messina) – 8:17
"Changes" (Messina) – 3:50
"Angry Eyes" (Loggins, Messina) – 7:42
"Sailin' The Wind" (Loggins) – 6:10
"Vahevala" (Daniel Loggins, Dann Lottermoser) – 4:46

Musical credits
Kenny Loggins – vocals, rhythm guitar, harmonica, acoustic guitar
Jim Messina – vocals, lead guitar, mandolin, acoustic guitar, dobro
Merel Bregante – drums, backing vocals
Chris Brooks – koto
Vince Charles – steel drums
Jon Clarke – tenor saxophone, baritone saxophone, soprano saxophone, bass clarinet, flute, oboe, English horn, recorder, alto flute, bass flute, steel drums
Victor Feldman – percussion
Al Garth – violin, tenor saxophone, alto saxophone, flute, steel drums, recorder, bass clarinet
Milt Holland – percussion
Michael Omartian – Hammond organ, piano, concertina, Hohner clavinet, steel drums, tack piano, Wurlitzer electric piano, harmonium
Don Roberts – tenor saxophone, flute, bass flute, soprano saxophone, alto flute, alto saxophone, bass clarinet
Larry Sims – bass, backing vocals
David Wallace – synthesizer

Production
Original session producer: Jim Messina
Compilation producer: Jeff Magid
Engineers: Alex Kazanegras, George Beauregard, Jim Messina, Corey Bailey, John Fiore
Mastering: Bernie Grundman
Photography: Ed Caraeff, Suzen Carson, Bruce Ditchfield, Urve Kuusik, Sandy Speiser, Tyler Thornton
Cover photo: Marsha Reed
Liner notes: David Wild

Loggins and Messina albums
2005 greatest hits albums
Columbia Records compilation albums
Albums produced by Jim Messina (musician)
Albums produced by Kenny Loggins